Eric Maurice Shelton (born February 2, 1991) is an American mixed martial arts fighter competed in the Flyweight division of the Ultimate Fighting Championship. A professional competitor since 2013, he has also competed for the RFA and was a contestant on The Ultimate Fighter: Tournament of Champions.

Mixed martial arts career

Early career
Shelton began his professional MMA career in July 2013, upon compiling an impressive 11–2 record during his amateur career. Over the next three-and-a-half years he fought mainly in the mid-west, amassing a record of 10–2.

The Ultimate Fighter
In July 2016, it was announced that Shelton would be a cast member of The Ultimate Fighter: Tournament of Champions. He was ranked #15 and selected by Team Benavidez.

In the first round, Shelton defeated Yoni Sherbatov via technical submission (rear-naked choke) in the second round. In the quarterfinals, he defeated Ronaldo Candido by unanimous decision. In the semifinals, Shelton lost to eventual winner Tim Elliott via unanimous decision after two rounds.

Ultimate Fighting Championship
After The Ultimate Fighter, Shelton was signed to a UFC contract. He faced Alexandre Pantoja in his debut on January 28, 2017, at UFC on Fox: Shevchenko vs. Peña. He lost the fight via split decision.

In his second fight for the promotion, Shelton faced Jarred Brooks on July 29, 2017, at UFC 214. He again lost the fight via split decision.

In his third fight for the promotion, Shelton faced Jenel Lausa on November 19, 2017, at UFC Fight Night: Werdum vs. Tybura. He won the fight via unanimous decision to earn his first UFC victory.

Shelton faced Alex Perez on February 24, 2018, at UFC on Fox: Emmett vs. Stephens. At the weigh-ins, Perez weighed in at 126.5 pounds, half a pound over the lightweight non title fight upper limit of 126 pounds. As a result, the bout proceeded at catchweight and Perez was fined 20% of his purse, which went to Shelton. Shelton lost the fight via unanimous decision.

Shelton faced Joseph Morales on November 10, 2018, at UFC Fight Night: Korean Zombie vs. Rodríguez. He won the fight via split decision.

Shelton faced Jordan Espinosa on March 23, 2019, at UFC Fight Night: Thompson vs. Pettis. He lost the fight via unanimous decision.

On May 26, 2019, it was reported that Shelton was released by UFC.

Post-UFC career
After being released from the UFC, Shelton signed with the WXC. He made his promotional debut against Jesse Bazzi at WXC 83 on October 30, 2019. He won the fight via unanimous decision.

With the win, Shelton earned a title shot against Juancamilo Ronderos at WXC 85 on December 18, 2019. He lost the fight via split decision.

On June 6, 2020, news surfaced that Shelton had signed with ARES FC.

Shelton faced Rilley Dutro for the vacant Caged Aggression Flyweight Championship on May 8, 2021. He claimed the championship after Dutro suffered an elbow injury in the fourth round.

Shelton faced Jacob Silva on December 19, 2021, at Fury FC 55. He won the bout via unanimous decision.

Championships and accomplishments
Caged Aggression
Flyweight Champion (Two times; current)

Mixed martial arts record

|-
|Loss
|align=center|15–8
|Peter Caballero
|Decision (unanimous)
|Fury FC 67
|
|align=center|3
|align=center|5:00
|Houston, Texas, United States
|
|-
|Win
|align=center|15–7
|Jacob Silva
|Decision (unanimous)
|Fury FC 55
|
|align=center|3
|align=center|5:00
|Houston, Texas, United States
|
|-
|Win
|align=center|14–7
|Rilley Dutro
|TKO (corner stoppage)
|Caged Aggression 31
|
|align=center|4
|align=center|4:10
|Davenport, Iowa, United States
|
|-
|Loss
|align=center|13–7
|Juancamilo Ronderos
|Decision (split)
|WXC 85: Warrior Wednesday 10 
|
|align=center|5
|align=center|5:00
|Southgate, Michigan, United States
|
|-
|Win
|align=center|13–6
|Jesse Bazzi
|Decision (unanimous)
|WXC 83: Warrior Wednesday 8 
|
|align=center|3
|align=center|5:00
|Southgate, Michigan, United States
|
|-
|Loss
|align=center|12–6
|Jordan Espinosa
|Decision (unanimous)
|UFC Fight Night: Thompson vs. Pettis 
|
|align=center|3
|align=center|5:00
|Nashville, Tennessee, United States
|
|-
|Win
|align=center|12–5
|Joseph Morales
|Decision (split)
|UFC Fight Night: Korean Zombie vs. Rodríguez 
|
|align=center|3
|align=center|5:00
|Denver, Colorado, United States
| 
|-
|Loss
|align=center|11–5
|Alex Perez
|Decision (unanimous)
|UFC on Fox: Emmett vs. Stephens 
|
|align=center|3
|align=center|5:00
|Orlando, Florida, United States
|
|-
|Win
|align=center|11–4
|Jenel Lausa
|Decision (unanimous)
|UFC Fight Night: Werdum vs. Tybura
|
|align=center|3
|align=center|5:00
|Sydney, Australia
|
|-
|Loss
|align=center|10–4
|Jarred Brooks
|Decision (split)
|UFC 214
|July 29, 2017
|align=center|3
|align=center|5:00
|Anaheim, California, United States
|
|-
|Loss
|align=center|10–3
|Alexandre Pantoja
|Decision (split)
|UFC on Fox: Shevchenko vs. Peña
|January 28, 2017	
|align=center|3
|align=center|5:00
|Denver, Colorado, United States
|
|-
|Win
|align=center|10–2
|Mark Sainci
|Submission (triangle choke)
|Caged Aggression 17
|April 2, 2016	
|align=center|1
|align=center|1:08
|Davenport, Iowa, United States
|
|-
|Win
|align=center|9–2
| Ryan Hollis
| Decision (unanimous)
|Cowboys Extreme Cagefighting
|January 30, 2016
|align=center|3
|align=center|5:00
|San Antonio, Texas, United States
|
|-
|Win
|align=center|8–2
|Gino Escamilla
|Decision (unanimous)
|Rocks Xtreme MMA 19
|October 23, 2015
|align=center|3
|align=center|5:00
|San Antonio, Texas, United States
|
|-
|Win
|align=center|7–2
|Brian Hall
|TKO (punches)
|V3 Fights
|September 26, 2015	
|align=center|2
|align=center|3:38
|Memphis, Tennessee, United States
|
|-
|Loss
|align=center|6–2
|Kevin Gray
|Decision (split)
|Caged Aggression 15 
|March 28, 2015	
|align=center|5
|align=center|5:00
|Davenport, Iowa, United States
|
|-
|Win
|align=center|6–1
|Erik Vo
|Submission (rear-naked choke)
|Pinnacle Combat 18 
|January 24, 2015	
|align=center|2
|align=center|1:09
|Dubuque, Iowa, United States
|
|-
|Win
|align=center|5–1
|Jose Vega
|Technical Submission (guillotine choke)
|Caged Aggression 14
|October 10, 2014	
|align=center|1
|align=center|0:00
|Davenport, Iowa, United States
|
|-
|Loss
|align=center|4–1
|Sid Bice
|Decision (unanimous)
|RFA 16: Copeland vs. Jorgensen 
|July 25, 2014
|align=center|3
|align=center|5:00
|Broomfield, Colorado, United States
|
|-
|Win
|align=center|4–0
|Chris Haney
|Submission (rear-naked choke)
|Xplode Fight Series: Anger
|May 2, 2014	
|align=center|1
|align=center|4:34
|Davenport, Iowa, United States
|
|-
|Win
|align=center|3–0
|Zachary Harvey
|TKO (punches)
|Caged Aggression 12
|March 15, 2014	
|align=center|1
|align=center|2:50
|Davenport, Iowa, United States
|
|-
|Win
|align=center|2–0
|Marcel Tong Van
|Submission (armbar)
|Caged Aggression 11
|October 12, 2013	
|align=center|1
|align=center|1:18
|Davenport, Iowa, United States
|
|-
|Win
|align=center|1–0
|Stephen Gladhill
|Decision (unanimous)
|Caged Aggression 10
|July 20, 2013	
|align=center|3
|align=center|5:00
|Davenport, Iowa, United States
|
|-

Mixed martial arts exhibition record

|-
|Loss
|align=center|2–1
| Tim Elliott
| Decision (majority)
| rowspan=3|The Ultimate Fighter: Tournament of Champions
| 
|align=center|2
|align=center|5:00
| rowspan=3|Las Vegas, Nevada, United States
|
|-
|Win
|align=center|2–0
| Ronaldo Candido
| Decision (unanimous)
| 
|align=center|2
|align=center|5:00
|
|-
|Win
|align=center|1–0
| Yoni Sherbatov
| Submission (rear-naked choke)
| 
|align=center|2
|align=center|3:40
|

Professional boxing record

References

External links
 
 

1991 births
Living people
American male mixed martial artists
Sportspeople from Lawton, Oklahoma
Flyweight mixed martial artists
Bantamweight mixed martial artists
Mixed martial artists utilizing boxing
Ultimate Fighting Championship male fighters
American male boxers